Alderney Nomads F.C. is a football club based on the Channel Island of Alderney. They play in the  Priaulx League - the league competition of Guernsey.

History
An offshoot of the Alderney official football team that competes in the Muratti Vase and Island Games, an Alderney FC club side was entered into the Guernsey Priaulx League for the 2016/17 season in order to give the players more game time.

Results

References

External links
 Official website

Football clubs in Guernsey
Sport in Alderney